The Transkentucky Transportation Railroad, Inc.  is a 50-mile rail transport line purchased from Louisville and Nashville Railroad in 1979 with the goal of transporting coal produced in Eastern Kentucky to the Ohio River. It is a Class III railroad that operates freight service between Paris and Maysville.

In 1991 CSX Transportation acquired Transkentucky Railroad Transportation, Inc. and Transcontinental Terminals, Inc.

Closure

The September 2017 issue of Railfan & Railroad carried this news item on page 14:

TTI Shuts Down?

As this issue went to press, reports indicated Transkentucky Transportation, famous for its fleet of older GE power, was calling it quits. Operating out of Paris, Ky., the railroad was historically a coal-hauler, shipping from the mine to a transloading facility on the Ohio River at Maysville. After its coal contract expired, the line saw little traffic. Heavy rains in late July reportedly washed out the railroad near Maysville; with traffic almost non-existent, it was decided to close the line and put the GE power up for sale. CSX has owned TTI, and its subsidiary Transcontinental Terminals, since 1981.

While the washed-out line to Maysville has remained closed, TTI has continued to function in Paris as a transload site. Though their last remaining U28B, TTI 260, went to the Illinois Railway Museum in July, 2019, the railroad still had eight former Seaboard GE B36-7 locomotives on the property at that time, all at its Paris, Ky., base. Though built as heavy road engines, two of them now alternate in switching service at the Paris transload.

Current and former equipment
The historical list of TTIS locomotives is presented below.

References

External links

 

Kentucky railroads
Transportation in Bourbon County, Kentucky
Railway companies established in 1979
1979 establishments in Kentucky
CSX Transportation lines
Paris, Kentucky